Zoël is a masculine given name. Notable people with the name include:

Zoël Amberg (born 1992), Swiss racing driver
Zoël Saindon (1919–1998), Canadian politician

See also
Noel (given name)

Masculine given names